The canton of La Chapelle-sur-Erdre is an administrative division of the Loire-Atlantique department, western France. Its borders were modified at the French canton reorganisation which came into effect in March 2015. Its seat is in La Chapelle-sur-Erdre.

It consists of the following communes:
La Chapelle-sur-Erdre
Fay-de-Bretagne
Grandchamps-des-Fontaines
Sucé-sur-Erdre
Treillières
Vigneux-de-Bretagne

References

Cantons of Loire-Atlantique